Đào Văn  Phong (born June 6, 1985, in Vietnam) is a Vietnamese footballer who is a left back for V.League 1 side Sanna Khánh Hòa BVN. He is a member of the Vietnam national football team

Achievements

Club
Quảng Nam
V.League 1:
 Winners : 2017

External links 

1985 births
Living people
Vietnamese footballers
Vietnam international footballers
Haiphong FC players
Thanh Hóa FC players
Quang Nam FC players
V.League 1 players
Association football defenders